The non-marine mollusks of the United States are a part of the molluscan fauna of the United States.

Freshwater gastropods
Amnicolidae
 Amnicola cora Hubricht 1979 - Foushee Cavesnail
 Amnicola dalli Pilsbry and Beecher 1892 - Peninsula Amnicola
 Amnicola decisus Haldeman 1845 
 Amnicola limosus Say 1817 - Mud Amnicola
 Ammicola rhombostoma Thompson 1968 - Squaremouth Amnicola
 Amnicola stygius Hubricht 1971 -Stygian Amnicola
 Colligyrus convexus Hershler, Fresh, Liu, and Johannes 2003 - Canary dusky-snail
 Colligyrus depressus Hershler 1999 - Harney Basin Duskysnail
 Colligyrus greggi Pilsbry 1935 - Rocky Mountain Duskysnail
 Dasyscias franzi Thompson and Hersler 1991 - Shaggy Ghostsnail
 Lyogyrus bakerianus Pilsbry 1917 - Baker's Springsnail
 Lyogyrus browni Carpenter 1872 - Slender Duskysnail
 Lyogyrus granum Say 1822 -Squat Duskysnail
 Lyogyrus latus Thompson and Hershler 1991 - cobble Sprite
 Lyogyrus pilsbryi Walker 1906 - Lake Duskysnail
 Lyogyrus pupoideus Gould 1841 - Pupa Duskysnail
 Lyogyrus retromargo Thompson 1968 - Indented Duskysnail
 Lyogyrus walkeri Pilsbry 1898 - Canadian Duskysnail

Pleuroceridae
 Lithasia armigera - armigerous river snail or armored rocksnail
 Lithasia curta) - knobby rocksnail
 Lithasia duttoniana - Dutton's river snail
 Lithasia geniculata - geniculate river snail
 Lithasia jayana - Jay's river snail
 Lithasia lima - Elk River file snail
 Lithasia salebrosa - muddy rocksnail
 Lithasia verrucosa varicose rocksnail

Hydrobiidae
 Tryonia alamosae - Alamosa springsnail
 Marstonia pachyta - armored marstonia - synonym: Pyrgulopsis pachyta
 Pyrgulopsis erythropoma - Ash Meadows pebblesnail
 Somatogyrus humerosus - atlas pebblesnail

Planorbidae
Amphigyra alabamensis Pilsbry 1906 Shoal Sprite
Biomphalaria havanensis Pfeiffer 1839 - Ghost Ramshorn
Ferrisia fragilis Tryon 1863 - Fragile Ancylid (limpet)
Ferrisia rivularis Say 1817 - Creeping Ancylid (limpet)
Gyraulus circumstriatus Tryon 1866 - Disc Gyro
Gyraulus crista Linnaeus 1758 - Star Gyro
Gyraulus deflectus Say 1824 - Flexed Gyro
Gyraulus hornensis Baker 1934 - Tuba Gyro
Gyraulus parvus Say 1817 - Ash Gyro
Gyraulus vermicularis Gould 1847 - Pacific Coast Gyro
Hebetancylus excentricus Morelet 1851 - Excentric Ancylid (limpet)
Helisoma anceps Menke 1830 -Two-ridge Ramshorn
Helisoma minus Cooper 1870 
Helisoma newberryi Lea 1858 Great Basin Ramshorn
Laevapex fuscus Adams 1841 -Dusky Ancylid
Menetus dilatatus Gould 1841 - Bugle Sprite
Menetus opercularis Gould 1847 - Button Sprite
Micromenetus brogniartianus Lea 1842 - Disc Sprite
Micromenetus floridensis Baker 1945 - Penny Sprite
Micromenetus sampsoni Ancey 1885 - Sampson Sprite
Neoplanorbis carinatus Walker 1908 - Carinate Flat-top Snail
Neoplanorbis smithi Walker 1908 - Angled Flat-top Snail
Neoplanorbis tantillus Pilsbry 1906 - Little Flat-top Snail
Neoplanorbis umbilicatus Walker 1908 - Umbilicate Flat-top Snail
Pecosorbis kansasensis Berry 1966 - New Mexico Ramshorn
Planorbella ammon Gould 1855 - Jupiter Ramshorn
Planorbella binneyi Tryon 1867 - Coarse Ramshorn
Planorbella campanulata Say 1821 - Bellmouth Ramshorn
Planorbella columbiensis Baker 1945 - Caribou Ramshorn
Planorbella corpulenta Say 1824 - Corpulent Ramshorn
Planorbella duryi Wetherby 1879 - Seminole Ramshorn
Planorbella magnifica Pilsbry 1903 - Magnificent Ramshorn
Planorbella multivolvis Case 1847 - Acorn Ramshorn
Planorbella occidentalis Cooper 1870 - Fine-lined Ramshorn
Planorbella oregonensis Tryon 1865 - Lamb Ramshorn
Planorbella pilsbryi Baker 1926 - File Ramshorn
Planorbella scalaris Jay 1839 - Mesa Ramshorn
Planorbella subcrenata Carpenter 1857 - Rough Ramshorn
Planorbella tenuis Dunker 1850 - Mexican Ramshorn
Planorbella traski Lea 1856 - Keeled Ramshorn
Planorbella trivolvis Say 1817 - Marsh Ramshorn
Planorbella truncata Miles 1861 - Druid Ramshorn
Planorbula armigera Say 1821 - Thicklip Ramshorn
Planorbula campestris Dawson 1875 - Meadow Ramshorn
Promenetus exacuous Say 1821 - Sharp Sprite
Promenetus umbillicatellus Cockerell 1887 - Thicklip Ramshorn
Rhodacmea cahawbensis Walker 1917 - Cahaba Ancylid
Rhodacmea elatior Anthony 1855 - Domed Ancylid
Rhodacmea filosa Conrad 1834 - Wicker Ancylid
Rhodacmea hinkleyi Walker 1908 - Knobby Ancylid
Vorticifex effusa Lea 1856 - Artemesian Ramshorn
Vorticifex solida Dall 1870 - 

Physidae
Aplexa elongata Say 1821 -Lance Aplexa
Archiphysa ashmuni Taylor 2003 - San Rafael Physa
Archiphysa sonomae Taylor 2003 - Sonoma Physa
Laurentiphysa chippuvarum Taylor 2003 - Chippewa Physa
Physa carolinae Wethington, Dillon, Wise 2009 - Carolina Physa
Physa jennessi Dall 1919 - Obtuse Physa
Physa megalochlamys Taylor 1988 - Cloaked Physa
Physa natricina Taylor 1988 - Snake River Physa
Physa sibirica Westerlund 1876 - Frigid Physa
Physa skinneri Taylor 1954 - Glass Physa
Physa vernalis Taylor and Jokinen 1984 - Vernal Physa
Physella acuta 
Physella ancillaria Say 1825 - Pumpkin Physa
Physella bermudezi Aguayo 1935 - Lowdome Physa
Physella bottimeri Clench 1924 - Comanche Physa
Physella boucardi Cross and Fischer 1881 - Desert Physa
Physella columbiana Hemphill 1890 - Rotund Physa
Physella conoidea Fischer and Crosse 1886 - Texas Physa
Physella cooperi Tryon 1865 - Olive Physa
Physella costata Newcomb 1861 - Ornate Physa
Physella cubensis Pfeiffer 1839 - Carib Physa
Physella globosa Haldeman 1841 - Globose Physa
Physella gyrina Say 1821 - Tadpole Physa
Physella gyrina propinqua Tryon 1865 - Rocky Mountain Physa
Physella gyrina utahensis  Clench 1925-  Physa
Physella hemphilli Taylor 2003 - Idaho Physa
Physella hendersoni Clench 1925 - Bayou Physa
Physella heterostropha Say 1817 - Pewter Physa
Physella hordacea Lea 1864 - Grain Physa
Physella humerosa Gould 1855 - Corkscrew Physa
Physella integra Haldeman 1841 - Ashy Physa
Physella johnsoni Clench 1926 - Banff Springs Physa
Physella lordi Baird 1863 - Twisted Physa
Physella magnalacustris Walker 1901 - Great Lakes Physa
Physella mexicana Phillippi 1841 - Polished Physa
Physella microstriata — Fish Lake physaChamberlain and Berry 1930; U.S. endemic/extinct
Physella natricina — Snake River physa snail
Physella osculans Haldeman 1841 - Cayuse Physa
Physella parkeri Currier 1881 - Broadshoulder Physa
Physella pomilla Conrad 1834 - Claiborne Physa
Physella spelunca Turner and Clench 1974 - Cave Physa
Physella squalida Morelet 1851 - Squalid Physa
Physella traski Lea 1864 - Sculpted Physa
Physella vinosa Gould 1847 - Banded Physa
Physella virgata Gould 1855 - Protean Physa
Physella virginea Gould 1847 - Sunset Physa
Physella winnipegensisPip 2004  - Lake Winnipeg Physa
Physella wrighti  Te and Clark 1985- Hotwater Physa
Physella zionis  Pilsbry 1926 - Wet-rock Physa

Lymnaeidae
Stagnicola bonnevillensis
Stagnicola utahensis — Thickshell pondsnail

Land gastropods
Land gastropods in the USA include:

Charopidae
 Radiodomus abietum (H.B. Baker, 1930)

Discidae
 Anguispira alternata (Say, 1816)
 Anguispira jessica Kutchka, 1938
 Anguispira kochi (L. Pfeiffer, 1846)
 Anguispira nimapuna H.B. Baker, 1932
 Anguispira strongyloides (Pfeiffer, 1854)
 Discus nigrimontanus (Pilsbry, 1924)
 Discus patulus (Deshayes, 1830)

Helicodiscidae
 Helicodiscus barri Hubricht, 1962
 Helicodiscus parallelus (Say, 1821)

Oreohelicidae
 Oreohelix idahoensis (Hemphill, 1890)
 Oreohelix strigosa depressa Pilsbry, 1904
 Oreohelix vortex S.S. Berry, 1932

Polygyridae
 Fumonelix archeri - Archer's toothed land snail
 Fumonelix jonesiana- big-tooth covert, Jones' middle-toothed land snail

Punctidae
 Punctum pygmaeum - Also known as the "dot snail", typically a translucent and flat shell, commonly found in forests or damp areas.

Freshwater bivalves
Unionidae
Quadrula — many species
Quadrula apiculata — Southern mapleleaf
Quadrula aurea — Golden orb
Quadrula tuberosa — Rough rockshell (extinct)

Federally endangered or threatened

Federally endangered or threatened freshwater molluscs 
There are 34 freshwater gastropod taxa on this list. The only marine endangered gastropod is Haliotis sorenseni. The only overseas endangered land snail is Papustyla pulcherrima. Altogether 36 gastropod species are federally listed as of 2 October 2009.

Federally endangered or threatened land gastropods

See also
 List of marine molluscs of the United States
 United States Fish and Wildlife Service list of endangered species

Lists of molluscs of surrounding countries:
 List of non-marine molluscs of Canada
 List of non-marine molluscs of Mexico
 List of non-marine molluscs of Cuba

References

External links
 Federally listed gastropods (include one marine)
 Federally listed bivalves
States
 uark.edu: Arkansas
Walker B. 1899. The terrestrial Mollusca of Michigan. 27 pp.
'"Ecology of Northern Michigan" —Anootated list of the molluscs of the Porcupine Mountains and Isle Royale, Michigan; pages 93-99; Walker B. & Ruthven A. G. 1906.
 nhp.nris.mt.gov: Montana
 fieldguide.mt.go: Gastropoda fieldguide to Montana
 carnegiemnh.org: Pennsylvania - land gastropods
 Southern Illinois - land gastropods
 Kathryn E. Perez. (last edited September 12, 2006) Land Snail List for Texas.
 Utah
 at http://www.dgif.virginia.gov/wildlife/publications/ Special Status Faunal Species in Virginia
 Official List of Virginia Native and Naturalized Species
 dnr.wi.gov: Wisconsin
 Williams, J. D., Bogan, A. E., Butler, R. S., Cummings, K. S., Garner, J. T., Harris, J. L., ... & Watters, G. T. (2017). "A Revised List of the Freshwater Mussels (Mollusca: Bivalvia: Unionida) of the United States and Canada". Freshwater Mollusk Biology and Conservation 20: 33-58.

Non Marine
Molluscs, Non Marine
United States
United States
United States